The Book Of Two Ways is a 2020 novel by American writer Jodi Picoult.

References

2020 American novels
Novels by Jodi Picoult
Ballantine Books books